The Gloucestershire County Board of the Gaelic Athletic Association (GAA) or Gloucester GAA, is one of the county boards outside Ireland and is responsible for the running of Gaelic Games in the South West of England and South Wales. With Scotland, Warwickshire, Lancashire, Hertfordshire, London and Yorkshire, the board makes up the British Provincial Board.

The Gloucestershire board oversees the Gaelic Football League and Championship of Gloucestershire. The County Board has been in existence since 1959 and in 2008 Gloucestershire won the British Junior Football Championship for the first time, defeating Warwickshire in the final in Cardiff on a scoreline of 1-12 (15) to 0-06.

St Jude's GAA of Bournemouth, Southampton and Portsmouth are the current county champions, having defeated St Nicholas GAC, Bristol in the 2018 Gloucestershire County Championship.

Gloucestershire Senior Football Championship

List of Finals

External links
 St Jude's GAA - club website
 St Nicholas GAC - club website
Western Gaels - club website

British GAA
Gaelic games governing bodies in the United Kingdom
Sport in Gloucestershire